Hugo is an unincorporated community in southern Camden County, in the U.S. state of Missouri. The community is located approximately 3.5 miles east-southeast of Camdenton on Missouri Route V, just north of Missouri Route 7.

History
A variant name was "Chauncy". A post office called Chauncy was established in 1883, the name was changed to Hugo in 1914, and the post office closed in 1943. The origin of the name Hugo is obscure.

Notable person
Charles D. Franklin, US Army lieutenant general, born in Hugo in 1931.

References

Unincorporated communities in Camden County, Missouri
Unincorporated communities in Missouri